In differential geometry, a hypercomplex manifold is a manifold with the tangent bundle
equipped with an action by the algebra of quaternions
in such a way that the quaternions 
define integrable almost complex structures.

If the almost complex structures are instead not assumed to be integrable, the manifold is called quaternionic, or almost hypercomplex.

Examples 

Every hyperkähler manifold is also hypercomplex.
The converse is not true. The Hopf surface
 
(with  acting
as a multiplication by a quaternion) is
hypercomplex, but not Kähler,
hence not hyperkähler either.
To see that the Hopf surface is not Kähler,
notice that it is diffeomorphic to a product
 hence its odd cohomology
group is odd-dimensional. By Hodge decomposition,
odd cohomology of a compact Kähler manifold
are always even-dimensional. In fact Hidekiyo Wakakuwa proved
 that on a compact hyperkähler manifold . 
Misha Verbitsky has shown that any compact
hypercomplex manifold admitting a Kähler structure is also hyperkähler.

In 1988, left-invariant hypercomplex structures on some compact Lie groups
were constructed by the physicists Philippe Spindel, Alexander Sevrin, Walter Troost, and Antoine Van Proeyen. In 1992, Dominic Joyce 
rediscovered this construction, and gave a complete classification of 
left-invariant hypercomplex structures on compact Lie groups. 
Here is the complete list.

 
 

where  denotes an -dimensional compact torus.

It is remarkable that any compact Lie group becomes
hypercomplex after it is multiplied by a sufficiently
big torus.

Basic properties 

Hypercomplex manifolds as such were studied by Charles Boyer in 1988. He also proved that in real dimension 4, the only compact hypercomplex
manifolds are the complex torus , the Hopf surface and 
the K3 surface.

Much earlier (in 1955) Morio Obata studied affine connection associated with almost hypercomplex structures (under the former terminology of Charles Ehresmann of almost quaternionic structures). His construction leads to what Edmond Bonan called the Obata connection which is torsion free, if and only if, "two" of the almost complex structures  are integrable and in this case the manifold is hypercomplex.

Twistor spaces 
There is a 2-dimensional sphere of quaternions
 satisfying .
Each of these quaternions gives a complex
structure on a hypercomplex manifold M. This
defines an almost complex structure on the manifold
, which is fibered over
This complex structure is integrable, as follows
from Obata's theorem (this was first explicitly proved by 
Dmitry Kaledin). This complex manifold

See also
 Quaternionic manifold
 Hyperkähler manifold

References

.
.
.
 .

Complex manifolds
Structures on manifolds